Time Between Trains is the 4th album by American singer-songwriter Susan Werner, released in 1998 (see 1998 in music).

Track listing
all songs written by Susan Werner, except where noted

"Time Between Trains" – 3:49
"Old Mistake" – 4:26
"Bring 'Round the Boat" – 3:36
"Sorry About Jesus" – 3:09
"Petaluma Afternoons" – 3:52
"Courting the Muse" – 3:30
"Montgomery Street" – 4:59
"Like Bonsai" (Greg Simon, Werner) – 4:07
"Can't Let You In" (Mike Sumler, Werner) – 3:44
"Standing in My Own Way" (Dana Cooper) – 3:57
"Vincent" (Don McLean) – 3:39
"Movie of My Life" (hidden track)

Personnel
Susan Werner – guitar, piano, vocals, vibraphone
Gary Buho Gazaway – trumpet
Steve Khan – accordion, Hammond organ
Viktor Krauss – acoustic bass
Hunter Lee – bagpipes
Kenny Malone – percussion, drums
Hank Medress – hands, palmas
Greg Morrow – drums
Jelly Roll Morton – harmonica
Michael Rhodes – electric bass
Tom Roady – percussion
Bill Schleicher – whistle
Darrell Scott – bouzouki, dobro, guitar, mandolin, electric guitar, keyboard, background vocals, resonator guitar
Antoine Silverman – violin

Production
Producer: Darrell Scott
Executive producer: Hank Medress
Associate producer: Miles Wilkinson
Engineer: Miles Wilkinson
Second engineer: Rob MacMillan
Mixing: Miles Wilkinson
Mastering: Peter Moore
Photography: Jay Strauss

References

Susan Werner albums
1998 albums